Mark Jayven "Mac" Tallo (born January 2, 1994) is a Filipino professional basketball player. He last played for the Bicol Volcanoes of the Maharlika Pilipinas Basketball League (MPBL). He was selected 10th overall by TNT KaTropa in the 2017 PBA draft.

Tallo is also a 3x3 basketball player and has suited up for the Chooks-to-Go 3x3 pro circuit teams.

References

1994 births
Living people
Ateneo de Manila University alumni
Basketball players from Cebu
Filipino men's basketball players
NLEX Road Warriors players
Point guards
TNT Tropang Giga players
De La Salle Green Archers basketball players
Maharlika Pilipinas Basketball League players
SWU Cobras basketball players
Filipino men's 3x3 basketball players
TNT Tropang Giga draft picks